Catopsis juncifolia is a plant species in the genus Catopsis. This species is native to Central America and southern Mexico.

References

juncifolia
Flora of Central America
Flora of Mexico
Plants described in 1904